Saint-Cœur-de-Marie is a community in the Canadian province of Quebec, located in the city of Alma in the Saguenay–Lac-Saint-Jean region.

The community was the birthplace of former Quebec premier Lucien Bouchard.

Communities in Saguenay–Lac-Saint-Jean